Ak-Koba (Ak-Kobı) is a rural locality (a settlement) in Ust-Koksinsky District, the Altai Republic, Russia. The population was 50 as of 2016. There are 5 streets.

Geography 
Ak-Koba is located 35 km southeast of Ust-Koksa (the district's administrative centre) by road. Zamulta is the nearest rural locality.

References 

Rural localities in Ust-Koksinsky District